Ntungamo is a town in the Western Region of Uganda. It is the largest town in Ntungamo District and the site of the district headquarters.

Location
The coordinates of the town are 0°52'55.0"S, 30°15'55.0"E (Latitude:-0.881944; Longitude:30.265278).

Overview
Ntungamo is a growing town, located on the Mbarara-Kabale highway. A tarmacked road branches off at Ntungamo to lead to Rukungiri. The town, as of November 2013, was grappling with rapid growth, sanitation, and water supply issues.

Population
The 2002 national census put the population of the town at 13,320. In 2010, the Uganda Bureau of Statistics (UBOS) estimated the population at 16,100. In 2011, UBOS estimated the mid-year population at 16,400. In 2014, the national population census conducted in August that year put the population at 18,854.

In 2015, the population of Ntungamo Municipality was projected at 31,700. In 2020, the mid-year population of the town was projected at 38,800. It was calculated that the population of Ntungamo Town grew at an average annual rate of 1.9 percent, between 2015 and 2020.

Points of interest
The following additional points of interest lie within the town limits or near the town borders:

1. The offices of Ntungamo Town Council

2. Ntungamo Central Market

3. Karegyeya Rock Shelter

4. Itojo Hospital, a 120-bed public  hospital owned by the Uganda Ministry of Health, and administered by the Ntungamo District Local administration.
5. The Ntungamo-Rukungiri Road, an all-tarmac road, starting here and ending in Rukungiri,  to the northwest.

6. The Mbarara–Ntungamo–Kabale–Katuna Road passes through the town in a general north to south direction.

7. 99.3 Radio Ankole - A local radio station broadcasting in Ntungamo and neighboring districts in Runyankore/Rukiga, Kinyarwanda and English

Notable people
 Eriya Kategaya, politician and lawyer, born raised and buried here
 Janet Museveni, politician and wife of president Yoweri Museveni, was born here in 1948
 Yoweri Museveni, military general and politician. President of Uganda since 1986. He and his wife maintain a home in the town.

See also
 Mugisha Muntu
 List of cities and towns in Uganda
 List of roads in Uganda

References

External links
 Ntungamo District Homepage
 Uganda Ministry of Local Government

Populated places in Western Region, Uganda
Cities in the Great Rift Valley
Ntungamo District
Ankole sub-region